PNS Tippu Sultan (DDG-185), a , served in the Pakistan Navy after it was acquired in 1994.

In 1998–2008, the extensive engineering modernization and midlife upgrade program by the Karachi Shipyard & Engineering Works at the Naval Base Karachi reclassified her status as guided missile destroyer.

Service history

Acquisition, construction, and modernization

She was designed and constructed by the Yarrow Shipbuilders, Glasgow, Scotland, she was laid down on 30 October 1974, and was launched on 19 July 1978. During her service with the Royal Navy, she was notable for her wartime operations during the Falklands War with Argentina.

On 3 October 1994, she was purchased by Pakistan after the successful negotiation with the United Kingdom, along with PNS Shah Jahan.

Upon arriving in Karachi, she underwent an extensive modernization and mid-life upgrade program by Karachi Shipyard & Engineering Works at the Naval Base Karachi in 1998–2002.

She was namesake after Tipu Sultan, a ruler of the Kingdom of Mysore, and was commissioned on 1 March 1994.

Her wartime performance included in deployments in patrolling off the Gulf of Aden, Gulf of Oman, Persian Gulf, Arabian Sea as well as deploying in the Mediterranean Sea when she was part of the multinational CTF-150. On 27 April 2020, the Pakistan military's Inter-Services Public Relations (ISPR) released a military footage showing the Navy conducting a firing exercise that sunk the Tippu Sultan in the Indian Ocean through cruise missile firing launched from a ship and a rotary aircraft.

Gallery

See also
 List of ships sunk by missiles

References

External links
 
 

1978 ships
Tariq-class destroyers
Ships built in Glasgow
Ships sunk by aircraft as targets